Escola do Santíssimo Rosário (ESSR; "Saint Rosary’s School," ) was a Catholic school in Santo António (St. Anthony's Parish), Macau, serving preschool through junior high school. The Roman Catholic Diocese of Macau operated the school.

History
Established by Father Joaquim Guerra S.J.M it opened at 5 R. das Estalagens (草堆街) in 1954.
It is a member of the Macau Catholic Schools Association.

As of June 2016 the projected enrollment of the 2016–2017 school year was about 60 students. At that time the Diocese of Macau announced that the school will close in 2017 due to a low enrollment.

References

External links

 Escola do Santíssimo Rosário  
 Portuguese Profile and Chinese Profile of the Alumni Association of Saint Rosary's School (Associação dos Antigos Alunos da Escola do Santíssimo Rosário; 聖玫瑰學校校友會) - at the Government Printing Bureau (Imprensa Oficial, 印務局), Government of Macau

Catholic schools in Macau
Catholic secondary schools in Macau
Educational institutions established in 1954
Educational institutions disestablished in 2017
1954 establishments in the Portuguese Empire